The twelfth season of CSI: Crime Scene Investigation premiered on CBS on September 21, 2011, and ended on May 9, 2012. The series stars Marg Helgenberger, Ted Danson and Elisabeth Shue.

Production
The show was moved to Wednesdays at 10:00 p.m. (P/E), following Criminal Minds.

Plot
Catherine and Nick adjust to life working under D.B. Russell, following their demotions, while Morgan Brody joins the CSI team ("73 Seconds"), in the twelfth season of CSI. This season, the team investigate crimes including the murder of a family ("Tell Tale Hearts"), a drowning in chocolate ("Bittersweet"), a death at a mob museum ("Maid Men"), a cold-case killing ("Crime After Crime"), the zippering of a body ("Zippered") and a sadistic slaying ("Freaks and Geeks"). Meanwhile, D.B. struggles to keep control of his family ("Brain Doe"), Morgan's helicopter is hijacked mid-flight ("CSI Down"), Doc Robbins' wife finds herself at the center of an investigation ("Genetic Disorder"), and Catherine works alongside the FBI ("Ms. Willows Regrets"), before making a life-changing decision ("Willows in the Wind"). Then, it's all change at the LVPD when Russell recruits Julie Finlay ("Seeing Red"), fresh out of anger management and ready to tackle cases such as the theft of a house ("Stealing Home"), a crippling blackout ("CSI Unplugged"), a murder at an Alice-in-Wonderland style wedding ("Malice in Wonderland"), and a race-truck explosion ("Dune and Gloom"). Later, the troubles continue for the CSI's personal lives, as Finn and D.B. struggle to come to terms with their past relationship, Ecklie is gunned down, Nick leaves CSI, and the Crime Lab is placed under the supervision of an outside agency ("Homecoming").

Cast

Main

Recurring
 Marc Vann as Conrad Ecklie (episodes 2, 4, 5, 12, 18, 21, 22)
 Jon Wellner as Henry Andrews (episodes 3, 5, 6, 8, 10–12, 14–17, 19–21)
 Larry M. Mitchell as Officer Mitchell (episodes 2, 3, 12, 13, 15, 19)
 Barbara Eve Harris as Sheriff Sherry Liston (episodes 4, 7, 8, 13, 22)
 Alex Carter as Lou Vartann (episodes 7, 8, 11, 14, 21)
 Monique Gabriela Curnen as Xiomara Garcia (episodes 2, 4, 9)
 Archie Kao  as Archie Johnson (episodes 11, 17, 19)

Changes
Ted Danson and Elisabeth Shue join the main cast, replacing Laurence Fishburne and the outgoing Marg Helgenberger, respectively. Elisabeth Harnois becomes a series regular. Episode 13 of this season is the first and only episode of the CSI franchise not to feature a female lead.

Episodes

Ratings

U.S. Nielsen ratings

Explanatory notes

References

External links
 
 CSI Listings at thefutoncritic.com
 CSI: Crime Scene Investigation (season 12) at IMDb

12
2011 American television seasons
2012 American television seasons